Great Limpopo Transfrontier Park is a 35,000 km² peace park that is in the process of being formed. It will link the Limpopo National Park (formerly known as Coutada 16) in Mozambique, Kruger National Park in South Africa, Gonarezhou National Park, Manjinji Pan Sanctuary and Malipati Safari Area in Zimbabwe, as well as the area between Kruger and Gonarezhou, the Sengwe communal land in Zimbabwe and the Makuleke region in South Africa.

History
The memorandum of understanding for the creation of the peace park was signed on November 10, 2000 as the Gaza-Kruger-Gonarezhou Transfrontier Park. In October 2001 the name was changed to the Great Limpopo Transfrontier Park. By the 5th World Parks Congress held in Durban, South Africa, in 2003 the treaty had not been ratified in Mozambique and Zimbabwe.

Fences between the parks have started to come down allowing the animals to take up their old migratory routes that were blocked before due to political boundaries.

On the October 4, 2001 the first 40 (including 3 breeding herds) of a planned 1000 elephants were translocated from the over-populated Kruger National Park to the war-ravaged Limpopo National Park. It would take 2½ years to complete the translocation.

The new Giriyondo Border Post between South Africa and Mozambique has started in March 2004.

There are new plans that should increase the size of the park to 99,800 km² (36,000 sq. mi.).

Park will include the following
 Great Limpopo Transfrontier Park
 Kruger National Park about 18,989 km² (Including private game farms that are Signatories to the Greater Limpopo Trans Frontier Co-operation Agreement (GLTFCA), e.g. Mjejane Game Reserve .)
 Makuleke region also see: Makuleke (tribe), and Makuleke about 240 km²
 Limpopo National Park (Mozambique) about 10,000 km²
 Banhine National Park (Mozambique) about 7,000 km²
 Zinave National Park (Mozambique) about 6,000 km²
 Maputo Elephant Reserve (Mozambique) about 700 km²
 Gonarezhou National Park (Zimbabwe) about 5,053 km²
 Manjinji Pan Sanctuary (Zimbabwe)
 Malipati Safari Area (Zimbabwe)
 Sengwe Safari Area (Zimbabwe)

Gallery

Fauna
This park comprises a gamut of wildlife including mammals such as elephant, southern white rhinoceros, giraffe, blue wildebeest, leopard, lion, cheetah, mongoose and spotted hyena.

Since 2005, the protected area is considered a Lion Conservation Unit.

Accommodation
Private Concession:
Machampane Wilderness Camp: 10-bed luxury tented camp nestled on the banks of the Machampane River. Specialises in walking safaris.

Park Camps:
Aguia Pesqueira: self-catering chalets and camping facilities
Albufeira: self-catering chalets and camping facilities

Activities

Shingwedzi 4x4 eco-trail: five-night, six-day fully self-sufficient 4x4 trail. Starts at Pafuri Picnic Site in Kruger National Park, enters Mozambique at Pafuri Border Post and traverses Parque Nacional do Limpopo, the Mozambique sector of the Great Limpopo Transfrontier Park camping at pans and on river banks.
Rio Elefantes Canoeing Trail: three-day paddle down the Rio Elefantes (Olifants River) from its confluence with the Shingwedzi to its confluence with the Limpopo. Camp wild at the side of the river in rustic bushcamps. Guided, fully catered and ported.
Palarangala Wilderness Trail: three nights spent camping out in a rustic bushcamp with days spent exploring the pristine wilderness area stocked with game from the adjacent Kruger National Park. Guided and fully catered.
Lebombo Hiking Trail: three night and four day trail spent hiking through pristine wilderness with good bird and game sightings. Fully catered with overnight accommodation in rustic bushcamps. Guided, fully catered and ported.
Elefantes Gorge Backpacking and Fishing Trail: three night and four day fully self-sufficient guided trail spent traversing the plateau of the Lebombos, camping wild and fishing for Tiger from the shores of Massingir Dam, an important Breeding Ground for the Nile Crocodile.

See also 
Limpopo National Park
Kruger National Park
Gonarezhou National Park

References

External links

 Great Limpopo Park
 Peace Parks Foundation
 SANParks Official Site
 Great Limpopo

National parks of Zimbabwe
Nature conservation in Mozambique
Kruger National Park
Southern miombo woodlands
Zambezian and mopane woodlands